Bretzville is an unincorporated community in Jackson Township, Dubois County, in the U.S. state of Indiana.

History 
Around the year 1850, William Bretz Sr. settled on the land. In 1866, his son, William Bretz Jr. mapped the land. The town was originally called New Town. When the townspeople wanted a post office, the government suggested the name be changed because it sounded like Newton, Indiana. The town was renamed Bretzville after its founder in June 1873. The post office was built in 1866, and was discontinued in 1915. In 1880, Bretzville's first school was started.

Bretzville Cemetery
The Bretzville Cemetery is located southeast of Bretzville at

Schools
 Cedar Crest Intermediate

Highways
 State Road 64
 State Road 162 "William A. Koch Memorial Highway"

References

Unincorporated communities in Dubois County, Indiana
Unincorporated communities in Indiana
Jasper, Indiana micropolitan area